Errowanbang is a locality in the Blayney Shire of New South Wales, Australia.

Errowanbang Public School opened in May 1954 and closed in December 2014.

Heritage listings
Errowanbang has a number of heritage-listed sites, including:
 Errowan Park, Old Errowanbang Lane: Old Errowanbang Woolshed

References

Localities in New South Wales